Megacraspedus imparellus is a moth of the family Gelechiidae. It was described by Fischer von Röslerstamm in 1843. It is found in Asia Minor, Russia (Uralsk), Andorra, Austria, Italy, the Czech Republic, Slovakia, Hungary and Romania.

References

Moths described in 1843
Megacraspedus